Duzakh Darreh or Duzakhdarreh may refer to:
 Duzakh Darreh, Jiroft, Kerman Province
 Duzakh Darreh, Rigan, Kerman Province
 Duzakh Darreh, Divandarreh, Kurdistan Province
 Duzakh Darreh, Saqqez, Kurdistan Province